Roeland Pieter Schaftenaar (born 29 July 1988) is a Dutch professional basketball player for ZZ Leiden of the BNXT League. He is also a member of the Netherlands national basketball team. His brother Olaf Schaftenaar also plays professional basketball.

Early life
Schaftenaar was born in Utrecht.

College career
Scaftenaar played NCAA Division I college basketball at Oregon State, from 2006 to 2010.

Professional career
Schaftenaar started his pro career by playing four years in the LEB Oro league, the Spanish second division.

On October 11, 2014, he signed with the Greek Basket League club Rethymno. On January 24, 2015, he extended his contract with the club for another two years. After temporarily leaving the team after the first 4 games of the 2016–17 season, he returned to Rethymno on January 23, 2017, in order to replace Brandon Edwards.

On September 12, 2017, he joined Faros Larissas of the Greek Basket League.

On 14 September 2021, Schaftenaar signed with Básquet Coruña, staying in the Spanish Leb Oro.

On 11 September 2022, Schaftenaar signed a one-year contract for ZZ Leiden, his first professional team in his native Netherlands.

National team career
Schaftenaar is a member of the senior Dutch national basketball team. With the senior Dutch team, he played at the EuroBasket 2015 tournament as a starter.

Personal life
Schaftenaar is the older brother of fellow Oregon State alum, and professional basketball player, Olaf Schaftenaar.

Statistics

Source: FIBA.com

References

External links
LEB Oro profile
Profile at draftexpress.com
Profile at eurobasket.com

1988 births
Living people
CB Breogán players
Centers (basketball)
Dutch Basketball League players
Dutch expatriate basketball people in the United States
Dutch men's basketball players
Gymnastikos S. Larissas B.C. players
Ionikos Nikaias B.C. players
Oregon State Beavers men's basketball players
Power forwards (basketball)
Rethymno B.C. players
Sportspeople from Utrecht (city)
UB La Palma players
ZZ Leiden players